Lesovsky was a racing car constructor. Lesovsky roadsters competed in the Indy 500 from 1950 to 1960.

World Championship Indy 500 results

Formula One constructors (Indianapolis only)
American Championship racing cars
American racecar constructors